Sivanathan Kishore (born 12 May 1962) is a Sri Lankan Tamil politician and former Member of Parliament.

Early life
Kishore was born on 12 May 1962.

Career
Kishore was a Red Cross official for 14 years. He was arrested by the Sri Lanka Army in April 1999 and handed over to the Terrorist Investigation Division. He was released in August 2000 after 16 months in detention.

Kishore was selected by the rebel Liberation Tigers of Tamil Eelam (LTTE) to be one of the Tamil National Alliance's (TNA) candidates in Vanni District at the 2004 parliamentary election. He was elected and entered Parliament.

In 2010, after the LTTE's military defeat in the civil war, the TNA deselected most of its LTTE appointed MPs, including Kishore. He subsequently joined the governing United People's Freedom Alliance (UPFA). He contested the 2010 parliamentary election as one of the UPFA's candidates in Vanni District but failed to get elected after coming ninth amongst the UPFA candidates.

Kishore contested the 2015 parliamentary election as one of the Tamil United Liberation Front's (TULF) candidates in Vanni District but again the TULF failed to win any seats in Parliament.

Electoral history

References

1962 births
Members of the 13th Parliament of Sri Lanka
Living people
People from Northern Province, Sri Lanka
Sri Lankan Hindus
Sri Lankan Tamil politicians
Tamil National Alliance politicians
Tamil United Liberation Front
United People's Freedom Alliance politicians